Rising Son Records is an independent record label founded in 1983 by Arlo Guthrie. The company has been located in the Old Trinity Church in Housatonic, Massachusetts (a village in the town of Great Barrington) since 1992.  The church was home to Alice and Ray Brock, whose Thanksgiving Day dinners were the inspiration for Guthrie's 1967 song "Alice's Restaurant Massacree". Two years later the song was released as a movie by the same name.  Rising Son Records offers Guthrie's complete catalogue of music, excepting the original Alice's Restaurant album, which remains under the ownership of Warner Music Group.

Rising Son catalogue

{|class="wikitable"
!Year
!Title
!Artist/Notes
|-
|2010
|Mrs. Hollywood
|Xavier
|-
|2009
|Tales of '69
|Arlo Guthrie
|-
|2008
|32Cents/Postage Due
|Arlo Guthrie with The Dillards
|-
|2007
|Ex Tempore
|Johnny Irion
|-
|2007
|In Times Like These
|Arlo Guthrie
|-
|2007
|This Land is Your Land
|Film soundtrack (re-issue)
|-
|2005
|Folk Uke
|Folk Uke
|-
|2005
|Live in Sydney
|Arlo Guthrie
|-
|2005
|The Last Train
|Gordon Titcomb
|-
|2004
|Entirely Live
|Sarah Lee Guthrie & Johnny Irion; EP
|-
|2004
|Better With You
|Terry A La Berry and Friends
|-
|2003
|Songs from the Southland
|Hans Theessink
|-
|2003
|Spain in My Heart
|Various
|-
|2002
|Banjo Man – A Tribute to Derroll Adams
|Various
|-
|2001
|Sarah Lee Guthrie
|Sarah Lee Guthrie & Johnny Irion
|-
|2000
|Full Circle
|Xavier
|-
|1998
|Lifeline
|Hans Theessink
|-
|1997
|Journey On
|Hans Theessink
|-
|1991
|Woody’s 20 Grow Big Songs
|Woody Guthrie
|-
|1986
|Hard Travelin’
|Film soundtrack
|-
|1986
|Someday
|Arlo Guthrie
|-
|1982
|Power of Love
|Arlo Guthrie
|-
|1979
|Outlasting the Blues
|Arlo Guthrie
|-
|1978
|One Night
| Arlo Guthrie
|-
|1976
|Amigo
| Arlo Guthrie
|-
|1974
|Arlo Guthrie
| Arlo Guthrie
|-
|1973
|Last of the Brooklyn Cowboys
|Arlo Guthrie
|-
|1972
|Hobo’s Lullabye
|Arlo Guthrie
|-
|1970
|Washington County
|Arlo Guthrie
|-
|1969
|Running Down the Road
| Arlo Guthrie
|-
|1968
|Arlo
| Arlo Guthrie
|}

References

External links

Folk record labels
American independent record labels
Record labels established in 1983
1983 establishments in the United States